Sullivan County is a county in the U.S. state of New York. As of the 2020 census, the population was 78,624. The county seat is Monticello. The county's name honors Major General John Sullivan, who was labeled at the time as a hero in the American Revolutionary War in part due to his successful campaign against the Iroquois (see Sullivan Expedition).

The county was the site of hundreds of Borscht Belt hotels and resorts, which had their heyday from the 1920s through the 1970s.

In 2010, the state's center of population was at the southern edge of Sullivan County.

History

When the Province of New York established its first twelve counties in 1683, the present Sullivan County was part of Ulster County. In 1809, Sullivan County was split from Ulster County.

In the late 19th century, the Industrial Revolution and the advent of factories driven by water power along the streams and rivers led to an increase in population attracted to the jobs. Hamlets enlarged into towns. As industry restructured, many of those jobs left before the middle of the twentieth century. The economy changed again after that, shifting to a more tourist-based variety and benefiting from resorts established by European Jewish immigrants and their descendants in what became called the Borscht Belt of the 20th century. Resort hotels featured a wide variety of entertainers, some nationally known. At the beginning of this period, visitors traveled to the area by train, and later by automobile. The area's natural resources also provided a setting for numerous summer camps frequented by the children of immigrants and their descendants.

Geography

Sullivan County is in the southern part of New York State, southeast of Binghamton and southwest of Albany. It is separated from Pennsylvania along its southwest boundary by the Delaware River.

The county, which starts about 70 miles northwest of New York City, is in the Catskill Mountains. Its northeastern corner is within the Catskill Park.

The highest point in the county is a 3,118-foot (950 m) peak unofficially known as Beech Mountain, near Hodge Pond, a subsidiary summit to Mongaup Mountain across the Ulster County line. The lowest point is along the Delaware River.

Adjacent counties
 Delaware County - north
 Ulster County - northeast
 Orange County - southeast
 Pike County, Pennsylvania - southwest
 Wayne County, Pennsylvania - west

Demographics

As of the 2000 census, there were 73,966 people, 27,661 households, and 18,311 families residing in the county. The population density was 76 people per square mile (29/km2). There were 44,730 housing units at an average density of 46 per square mile (18/km2). The racial makeup of the county was 85.31% White, 8.51% Black or African American, 0.27% Native American, 1.12% Asian, 0.04% Pacific Islander, 2.89% from other races, and 1.87% from two or more races. 9.25% of the population were Hispanic or Latino of any race. 16.6% were of German, 13.9% Irish, 12.5% Italian, 7.3% American and 6.2% English ancestry according to 2000 census. 86.6% spoke English, 7.4% Spanish and 1.0% German as their first language. A small population of Russians, late twentieth-century immigrants, live in the villages. There are a few persons in Sullivan and nearby counties who are of mixed Dutch and Mohawk or Lenni-Lenape ancestry in this region of upstate New York, the legacy of indigenous peoples in the region and the New Netherlands colonial era in the 17th century.

There were 27,661 households, out of which 31.30% had children under the age of 18 living with them, 50.10% were married couples living together, 11.40% had a female householder with no husband present, and 33.80% were non-families. 27.90% of all households were made up of individuals, and 11.40% had someone living alone who was 65 years of age or older. The average household size was 2.50 and the average family size was 3.05.

In the county, the population was spread out, with 24.90% under the age of 18, 7.30% from 18 to 24, 28.10% from 25 to 44, 25.40% from 45 to 64, and 14.30% who were 65 years of age or older. The median age was 39 years. For every 100 females, there were 103.60 males. For every 100 females age 18 and over, there were 102.80 males.

The median income for a household in the county was $36,998, and the median income for a family was $43,458. Males had a median income of $36,110 versus $25,754 for females. The per capita income for the county was $18,892. About 11.60% of families and 17.40% of the population were below the poverty line, including 21.60% of those under age 18 and 10.70% of those age 65 or over.

2020 census

National protected area
 Upper Delaware Scenic and Recreational River (part)

Government and politics
Sullivan County is a swing county, backing the national winner in all but three presidential elections from 1952 to the present. In 2004, Republican George W. Bush defeated Democrat John Kerry by a margin of 49.47% to 48.55%, or a difference of 285 votes. In 2008, however, it was won by Democrat Barack Obama over Republican John McCain by a margin of 54% to 45%. The margin remained virtually the same in 2012, as Obama won the county again over Republican Mitt Romney by 54-44%. But then, in 2016, the county swung to Republican Donald Trump over Democrat Hillary Clinton by a margin of 53% to 42%. In 2020, the county didn't back the winner nationally for the first time since 2000. Incumbent Republican President Donald Trump won the county with 54% of the votes that year compared to the national winner Democrat Joe Biden's 45%.

There are thirty-six town and village courts in Sullivan County.

Legislative authority is vested in the county legislature which consists of nine members, each elected from single member districts. Currently, there are six Republicans and three Democrats.

|}

Education

Public school districts
 Eldred Central Schools
 Fallsburg Central Schools
 Liberty Central School District
 Livingston Manor Central School District
 Monticello Central Schools
 Roscoe Central Schools
 Sullivan West Central School
 Tri-Valley Central School

Higher education
 Sullivan County Community College is located in the hamlet of Loch Sheldrake in the town of Fallsburg.

Transportation
Sullivan County has services provided by Short Line to New York City. It also has some local service provided by the county itself, as well as community organizations.

Sullivan County International Airport is located in Bethel and is used frequently for general aviation purposes.

Major roadways

Tourism
Sullivan County has been a popular vacation spot since the 19th century, with mountain climbing, boating, and other outdoor activities, as well as the Monticello Raceway being among the attractions. The majority of the tourism occurs in the summer months. It was the site of the hundreds of resort complexes of the Borscht Belt (with their golf courses, social events, and entertainers), between the 1920s and 1970s.

Borscht Belt hotels, bungalow colonies, summer camps, and kuchaleyns (a Yiddish name for self-catered boarding houses). The bungalows usually included 
"a kitchen/living room/dinette, one bedroom, and a screened porch" with entertainment being simple: bingo or a movie. The kuchaleyns were also visited often by middle and working-class Jewish New Yorkers. Because of the many Jewish guests, this area was nicknamed the Jewish Alps and "Solomon County" (a modification of Sullivan County) by many people who visited there.

Many famous comedians tested their material and performed regularly at Borscht Belt hotels, including Milton Berle, Mel Brooks, and Henny Youngman. Eddie Fisher performed often at Grossinger's, where in 1955 he married Debbie Reynolds.

By the late 1950s, many began closing with most gone by the 1970s, but some major resorts continued to operate, a few into the 1990s. Grossinger's Catskill Resort Hotel closed in 1986 and the Concord Resort Hotel struggled to stay open until 1998. By that time, the business owed millions in back taxes to Sullivan County, but the property was sold "for $10.5 million" and a new resort was eventually built.

Sullivan County was the site of the 1969 Woodstock Festival located at the present-day Bethel Woods Center for the Arts. During the period August 15–18, 1969, approximately 500,000 people gathered in Sullivan County's Town of Bethel at Max Yasgur's farm to attend the Woodstock Festival. The entertainers included The Who; the Grateful Dead; Jefferson Airplane; The Band; Canned Heat; Joan Baez; Arlo Guthrie; Crosby, Stills, Nash and Young; Janis Joplin; Santana; Sly and the Family Stone; Blood, Sweat and Tears; Jimi Hendrix; and Richie Havens. The state and the town of Bethel council subsequently passed laws prohibiting future mass event types of festivals. In 2019, a 50th celebration of Woodstock was organized: "Sullivan County ... finally embracing the ultimate symbol of peace and love, the 1969 Woodstock festival". The Woodstock 50 festival, scheduled for August, was canceled months earlier so it did not take place. The Bethel Woods Center for the Arts did organize of weekend of "low-key" concerts.

Bethel Woods Center for the Arts, which also includes a museum of the sixties and Woodstock, holds many concerts and other events throughout the year.

Other notable cultural destinations include the CAS Arts Center, a multi-arts exhibit space and education center run by the Catskill Art Society in Livingston Manor, New York, the NaCl Theatre, a professional regional theater company focusing on experimental work in Highland Lake, and the Delaware Valley Arts Alliance (DVAA) which serves as the Arts Council for Sullivan County and is located in Narrowsburg. DVAA offers two art galleries, performing arts and cultural programming, grant opportunities for artists and nonprofits, the Big Eddy Film Festival, and Riverfest.

Communities

Towns

 Bethel
 Callicoon
 Cochecton
 Delaware
 Fallsburg
 Forestburgh
 Fremont
 Highland
 Liberty
 Lumberland
 Mamakating
 Neversink
 Rockland
 Thompson
 Tusten

Villages
 Bloomingburg
 Jeffersonville
 Liberty
 Monticello (county seat)
 Woodridge
 Wurtsboro

Census-designated places

 Barryville
 Bridgeville
 Callicoon
 Eldred
 Fallsburg
 Grahamsville
 Hankins
 Hortonville
 Hurleyville
 Kauneonga Lake
 Kiamesha Lake
 Lake Huntington
 Livingston Manor
 Loch Sheldrake
 Mongaup Valley
 Mountain Dale
 Narrowsburg
 Rock Hill
 Roscoe
 Smallwood
 South Fallsburg
 Swan Lake
 White Lake
 Woodbourne
 Wurtsboro Hills

Hamlets

 Debruce
 Ferndale
 Glen Spey
 Handsome Eddy
 Harris
 Haven
 Hazel
 Lew Beach
 Long Eddy
 Minisink Ford
 North Branch
 Spring Glen
 Summitville
 White Sulphur Springs

Notable people
 

Steve Lungen (born c. 1946), former District Attorney

See also

 Upstate New York
 Hudson Valley
 Catskill Mountains
 List of counties in New York
 National Register of Historic Places listings in Sullivan County, New York
 Borscht Belt
 Woodstock Festival

References
Notes

Further reading

External links

 Sullivan County, New York
 Sullivan County Chamber of Commerce
 
 Sullivan County information
 Sullivan County information
 Sullivan County Historical Society
 Sullivan County Emergency Services
 Early Sullivan County History
 Map of Fire Stations in Sullivan County

 
1809 establishments in New York (state)
Populated places established in 1809
Borscht Belt
Sullivan County, New York